The 34th Street Ferry station was a station on the 34th Street Shuttle that branched off of the demolished IRT Third Avenue Line in Manhattan, New York City. The elevated spur operated from July 1, 1880, to July 14, 1930. Located on the east side of First Avenue, the station had two tracks and one island platform. It served the 34th Street Ferry Terminal, which provided connecting services to the Long Island Rail Road's passenger terminal in Long Island City.

The next stop on the shuttle was Second Avenue.

References

External links
34th Street Shuttle at Station Reporter
34th St Ferry Spur at Picasa Web Albums

IRT Second Avenue Line stations
Railway stations in the United States opened in 1880
1880 establishments in New York (state)
Railway stations closed in 1930
Former elevated and subway stations in Manhattan
1930 disestablishments in New York (state)
34th Street (Manhattan)